Blue Demon contra las diabólicas (also known as Blue Demon vs. the Infernal Brains) is a 1966 (various sources also say 1967) Mexican horror film. It was directed by Chano Urueta and stars David Reynoso, Ana Martín and the wrestler Blue Demon.

References

External links
 
 

1967 films
Mexican monster movies
1960s Spanish-language films
Films directed by Chano Urueta
1967 horror films
1960s monster movies
1960s Mexican films